Italy's solar power generation capacity is one of the largest in the world, with its 22.56 GW putting it sixth, just ahead of Australia. In 2019, Italy set a national goal of reaching 50 GW by 2030. In 2022, Italy is anticipating more than 3 GW of new capacity, which will be the largest addition to solar generation since 2012.

During the first decade of this century, Italy was the third country after Germany and Spain to experience an unprecedented boom in solar installations after actively promoting solar power through government incentives. In July 2005, the country launched its first "Conto Energia" programme supporting the development of renewable power. Growth in solar installations picked up immediately but it was the years 2009–2013 that saw a boom in installed photovoltaic (PV) nameplate capacity, increasing nearly 15-fold, and 2012's year-end capacity of over 16 GW ranked second in the world after Germany, ahead of the other leading contenders, China, Japan and the United States at that time.

The year of 2011 saw the greatest growth with a massive 9 GW of power added, leapfrogging the country to its leading position at this time. The boom had many parallels with the earlier Spanish experience, although its peak year occurred three years later than the 2008 one in Spain. The later and more developed solar industry at that time contributed to Italy achieving a much larger solar capacity after its programme, with around four times the capacity found in Spain at the end of 2013. Solar capacity growth slowed after 2013, due to cessation of governmental subsidy programmes. Since then, annual installed PV capacity has been growing steadily at around 300–400 MW per year.

Solar power accounted for 7% of the electricity generated in Italy during 2013, ranking first in the world. By 2017, that number was close to 8%, which was beaten only by Germany in Europe, with more than 730 000 solar power plants installed in Italy and a total capacity of 19.7 GW. In 2018, capacity exceeded the 20 GW milestone and The "National Energy Strategy", SEN, published in 2017 outlined the ambition to reach 50 GW by 2030. Sun energy currently produces around 26% of all renewable energy in the country. , the sector provided employment to about 100,000 people, especially in design and installation.

The Montalto di Castro Photovoltaic Power Station, completed in 2010, is the largest photovoltaic power station in Italy with 85 MW. Other examples of large PV plants in Italy are San Bellino (70.6 MW), Cellino san Marco (42.7 MW) and Sant’ Alberto (34.6 MW).

Apart from the more conventional solar PV technology, Italy may in the future challenge Spain as the role of Europe's leading country in the developing technology concentrated solar power (CSP). CSP requires higher direct solar irradiation to function efficiently, which leaves only part of the country suitable for this technique. However, the southern regions as well as the islands of Sicily and Sardinia offer good conditions for CSP, and the Italian government has made large investments to promote this development. Today, there are three plants up and running in the country. The first one, Archimede solar plant, was installed on the island of Sicily in 2010, with a capacity of 5 MW. However, planning and promotion is underway for several additional projects, which would add another yearly capacity of 360 MW.

Photovoltaics

Installed capacity 

Installed capacity in Italy was less than 100 MW before 2008. Growth accelerated during 2008 and 2009 to reach over 1,000 MW installed capacity and tripled during 2010 to exceed 3,000 MW. The standout boom year in Italy was during 2011 when over 9,000 MW of solar power was added. This huge and rapid rise in installations was mostly due to the very generous "Conto Energia" support schemes operating during these years. A more responsive support scheme might have reduced support more quickly and lead to less rapid growth during 2011 but stronger medium term growth.

By the end of the solar boom during 2011 Italy was second in the world in terms of installed capacity after Germany. Solar power accounted for 2.6% of electricity generated in the EU and 6.7% of electricity generated in Italy- the most in Europe. In 2011 Italy ranked first in installed solar power from new PV plants- with roughly four times the amount of power that was supplied in 2010. As of the end of 2010, there were 155,977 solar PV plants, with a total capacity of 3,469.9 MW. By the end of 2011 there were 330,196 installations, totalling 12,773 MW. Plants were increasing both in number and size as can be seen from the faster pace of growth of installed capacity compared with raw installation numbers.

Growth after 2011 slowed as the schemes were revised at sporadic intervals rather than timely interventions based on cost and deployment. In 2012 Italy added an estimated 3.4 GW of new capacity, a figure much reduced on 2011 but still a large rise in the context of solar development by that year. A 2013 report by Deutsche Bank concluded that solar power has already reached grid parity in Italy. With the ending of the Conto Energia schemes in July 2013 growth reduced considerably. Nevertheless, since 2014, annual capacity growth has remained consistent at around 2% per year or 300-400 MW per year to 2018. Much of this growth has been driven by residential Solar PV, subject to tax allowances, representing 40-50 per cent of new capacity in the years 2017-2018 alone. In 2017 the first incentive free Solar power plant was installed, with a 63 MW capacity followed by others up to 30 MW in size in 2018. By the end of 2018 installed capacity in Italy exceeded the 20 GW milestone for the first time. As of 2018, solar PV accounts for 7.9% of electricity demand, making Italy a major leader in solar power generation and development.

Future prospects 
The "National Energy Strategy", SEN, published in 2017 and in the "Proposal of an Integrated National Plan for Energy and Climate" (PNIEC), published in December 2018 outline a target of reaching 50 GW of Solar PV installed power by 2030. This is part of a strategy to obtain 30% of Gross Final Energy Consumption from renewable sources by 2030, a measure including not only electrical energy but all energy consumed in Italy. A new Decree for Renewable sources is being awaited by the Solar industry which if adopted will support maintenance, re-powering and revamping of existing plants and new measures to benefit residential Solar PV.

Regional installations 

More than a fifth of the total production in 2010 came from the southern region of Apulia. In 2011, 20% came from Apulia, followed by 10% from Emilia-Romagna. The annual energy production from solar PV in Italy ranges from 1,000 to 1,500 kWh per installed kWp.

Solar PV market segmentation 

Systems of less than 10 kW accounted for 19.6% of totalled installed capacity. These are single direct use systems, mostly residential solar pv systems. Systems rated 10-100 kW represented 20.9% of capacity and represents systems used collectively within one place such as a large residential block or large commercial premise or intensive agricultural units. The next class size of systems 100-500 kW may represent larger commercial centers, hospitals, schools or industrial / agricultural premises or smaller ground mounted systems. The final category of systems rated over 500 kW mostly represent district power systems, ground mounted panels providing power to perhaps a mix of industrial and commercial sites. It is interesting to note that whilst large power plants receive a lot of attention in solar power articles, installations under 0.5 MW in size actually represent nearly 80% of the installed capacity in Italy in 2017.Nearly all Solar PV in Italy is grid connected with just 14 MW being off-grid as of 2017.

Building Integrated Photovoltaic systems (BIPV) accounted for 2,650 MW of capacity in 2014, these are solar cells integrated into the building itself such as construction materials, roof tiles and ceramic or glass facades. Building Applied Photovoltaic systems (BAPV) measure 7,125 MW and are regular solar cell systems that are generally installed on top of roofs. Ground mounted PV totalled 8,650 MW whilst Concentrator Photovoltaics (CPV) amounted to 30 MW which use lenses or curved mirrors to focus sunlight onto small, highly efficient, multi-junction (MJ) solar cells.

Residential Solar PV Capacity 

According to a report on behalf of the European Commission Italy had 2,640 MW of residential solar PV capacity with 709,000 residential solar PV prosumers in the country representing 2.7% of households as of 2015. The average size of residential solar PV systems is estimated to be 3.73 kW moving to 2030. The technical potential for residential solar PV in Italy is estimated at 24,867 MW. The payback time for residential Solar PV in Italy is 6 years as of 2015. Some of the advantages of small scale residential Solar include eliminating the need for extra land, keeping cost saving advantages in local communities and empowering households to become prosumers of renewable electricity and thus raising awareness of wasteful consumption habits and environmental issues through direct experience.

Largest PV power plants

History 
Around 1850 wood, charcoal and straw were the main energy sources for many European countries. In Italy, due to a lack of coal, renewable hydro energy from the Alps made industrialisation possible at the end of the 19th century. Using the local hydro resources made it also possible to be independent of coal imports. In 1914, 74% of the Italian electric power came from hydroelectricity. By the early 1990s there were already pioneers of solar energy in Italy. One was the chemist Giacomo Ciamician. In his journal article, ‘The Photochemistry of the Future’ he predicted the use of solar energy.

During World War I, Italy was not able to prevent an energy crisis revealing the dependence on imported fuels, mainly coal. After the crisis, hydro-power installations increased to ensure energy independence. This interest in locally available energy sources was in line with the economic self-sufficiency policies of the fascist regime. With the promotion of these policies, research into renewable energy use increased. As a result, more than 90% of total electricity production was renewable energy by the start of World War II.

After World War II there was a change in policies. Energy demand was rapidly growing, and new policies aimed at supplying energy through imported fossil fuels and the development of nuclear energy. Due to these changes, dependence on imported fuels grew to more than 80% in 2005.

With the oil shock in 1973, it was not any longer just pioneers, like Giorgio Nebbia and Giovanni Francia, showing interest in solar energy. Oil shortages led to an increase in events and programs addressing solar energy. The Energy Finalized Project Number 1 (PFE1) in 1972 and PFE2 in 1982 were started with the aim of promoting an energy saving culture in Italy, including energy efficiency and solar energy. Furthermore, some promising developments and Congresses in solar energy took place, but with falling oil prices in the 1980s these programs were soon forgotten. These developments included the Italian Section of ISES national Congress in Naples in 1977 and "The first Congress and Exhibition on Solar Energy" in Genoa in 1978. In Genoa an Italian first in solar energy was underlined, as in 1963, Giovanni Francia built the first solar plant able to produce steam at temperatures above 550 °C. This solar plant was based on the central receiver and mirror field concept.

After the falling oil prices in the 1980s and the declining interest in solar power, in the late 1990s the interest in solar energy increased again, mainly because of the concerns on climate change.

Socioeconomic effects 
Conflicts with the placement of solar plants require researching the population density of nearby towns and/or urban areas, as the solar plants and solar fields will cause visual disruptions and potential emission of pollutants. Areas that allow for easy access to the solar panels for repair, the clearing of overgrown vegetation, and routine panel washing are ideal, as well as being located close to roads to decrease further building costs of additional roads and service pathways and to avoid inaccessibility to service vehicles. Being located close the power grid will also lower the cost of transmission and the loss of power, decreasing the economical strain put on the area for building costs and shortening the amount of time until the original cost is overshadowed by the solar plant or field's production. Original or continued land use or cover must also be taken into consideration as areas with large topographic feature will have a tendency to be shadowed more heavily. Areas with large quantities of trees could be overshadowed or have an increased risk of destruction in inclement weather. Locales with poor soil, heavy metal contamination, erosion, or are unfit for rural or urbanisation could be used for solar energy production—reducing the need to buy out farmers, disrupt pristine areas, and lessen the effect on surrounding habitats.

Energy policies 
Government targets for renewable energy sources (RES) and different support schemes, especially for solar photovoltaics, resulted in an increase from 7.9% (2005) to 18.2% (2015) in total share of renewable energy in the total primary energy supply (TPES). 1.6% of the 18.2% renewables share is made up of solar energy. From 2005 to 2015 solar power has increased on average by 63.7% per year. The share of renewables in electricity generation has increased from 17.2% in 2005 to 40.2% in 2015, including 9.3% of solar power. This is the highest share of solar in electricity among International Energy Agency (IEA) countries. And the third-highest share of solar power in TPES.

Institutions 
Important institutions that are responsible for energy policies, the promotion and development of renewable energy, energy efficiency, co-ordination and payment of incentives are the Ministry of Economic Development (MSE), the Ministry for the Environment, Land and Sea (MATTM), the Ministry of Agricultural, Food and Forestry Policies (MIPAAF), the Regulatory Authority for Energy, Networks and Environment (ARERA, formerly AEEGSI, Autorità per l‘Energia elettrica e il Gas), the Gestore Servizi Energetici (GSE), the National Agency for New Technologies, Energy and Sustainable Economic Development (ENEA) and Terna.

Policy 
The Directive 2009/28/EC establishes a framework for promoting the use of renewable energy sources. According to this Directive, 17% of Italy's final energy consumption must be supplied by renewable sources in 2020. Italy's 2010 National Renewable Energy Action Plan (NREAP) identifies sectoral targets and how to achieve them. In the 2013 National Energy Strategy (NES), Italy established energy aims to achieve by 2020 that rises the 17% EU target for renewable energy in final energy consumption to 19% or 20%. Energy efficiency, but also renewable energies, plays an important role for this strategy.

Conto Energia (Feed-in tariffs)

In 2005 the Italian government introduced the first feed in tariffs (FIT) specifically for photovoltaics connected to the grid, the Conto Energia schemes. The payments for the schemes were designed to be made over a 20-year period and to incentivise both smaller and larger producers to invest in the installation of photovoltaic plants and systems. Between 2005 and 2013, five different Conto Energia schemes were introduced by ministerial decree. Each scheme had differing terms and conditions and tariffs provided to producers.

The following table provides a summary of the costs and the solar capacities installed under Conto Energia schemes 1-5:

The first Conto Energia resulted in the relatively small amount of 163 MW of new PV installations, perhaps because solar power was still in its infancy in 2005.

In 2007, The second Conto Energia resulted in a massive increase of 6,791 MW of new PVs at an annual cost of €3.27 billion, and was the most costly scheme. Almost half of the total cost of the schemes is accounted for by Conto Energia 2.

Conto Energia 3 ran briefly, resulting in 1,567 MW of installed power at an annual cost of €0.65 billion. This was succeeded by Conto Energia 4 which resulted in the largest increase in solar capacity so far at 7,600 MW of installed power at the annual cost of €2.47 billion.

The final Conto Energia 5 was introduced by ministerial decree in 2012. It was announced that the feed in tariff would end once the total annual costs of the cumulative Conto Energia scheme reached €6.7 billion. This figure was reached in 2013 and the final Conto Energia scheme was ended on 6 July 2013. The final scheme resulted in a further 2,095 MW of installed capacity at a cost of €0.22 billion. Under the Conto Energia incentive scheme, a total of 18,217 MW of installed solar PV power was added at annual cost of €6.7 billion.

Conto termico 
In 2013, the support schemes changed and a new scheme, the conto termico, was introduced in the heat sector. This support scheme provides incentives for the installation of renewable heating and cooling systems, and for efficiencient refurbishments, including solar thermal systems. Receiving support from the scheme depends on type of intervention and is granted for two to five years, with the amount depending on expected energy production. Additional factors like greenhouse gases impact of different bioenergy technologies, also influence the support granted. The total annual support payments are capped at €200 million for public administrations and €700 million for privately owned entities.

There are also several other incentives like tax credits for photovoltaic systems and solar thermal energy plants. A net metering scheme supports RES-E producers with plant capacities between 20 kW and 500 kW.

Research and funding 
In 2013, the government funded energy technology research, development and demonstration (RD&D) with €529 million. In recent years, other areas of the government budget were restructured. Between 2000 and 2013, nuclear research and development funding decreased from 40.7% to 18.2% in favour of energy efficiency and renewable energy, which grew from 13.8% to 21.5% in the same time period.

Concentrated solar energy technologies and photovoltaics are fields of active projects and research areas. ENEA has been researching on concentrated solar energy technologies since 2001 and introduced several innovations. The Archimede Project is one such developed project.

Solar technologies

Solar potential and development 
The entire nation of Italy retains high potential for solar energy production, ranging from 3.6 kWh per square meter per day in the Po river plain to 5.4kWh per square meter per day in Sicily. As of 2018, solar PVs account for 7.9% of electricity demand. As such, Italy is a major leader in solar power generation and development. While solar power has a great capacity for energy generation, solar technologies are best paired with technologies that consume technologies efficiently. Solar energy is expected to reach levels of energy production comparable to conventional methods in the near future.

Italy's solar power production continues to increase over the years. During 2017 five grid-parity PV plants, which collectively hold a capacity of 63 MW, had already been installed by July. These panels are located in the Montalto di Castro region of Italy and were supplied by Canadian Solar Inc.

Concentrated solar power 
Italy currently maintains various concentrated solar power (CSP) projects. Concentrated solar power plants concentrate solar energy into single points of collection with, for instance, mirrors, to maximise energy capture. Four types of CSP technologies are currently available on the market. These include parabolic troughs, fresnel mirrors, power towers, and solar dish collectors. The 15 MWt Archimede solar field is a thermal field at Priolo Gargallo near Syracuse. The plant was inaugurated on 14 July 2010, and continues to be operational in a solar field of 31,860 square meters. It is the first concentrated solar power plant to use molten salt for heat transfer and storage which is integrated with a combined-cycle gas facility. Upon generating thermal energy, two tanks are available to store thermal energy for up to 8 hours. The two other CSP systems are the ASE demo plant, which uses parabolic trough technology to focus solar energy, and the Rende-CSP plant, which uses Linear Fresnel reflector technology to focus solar energy to one point of fluidised storage consisting of oil.

Salerno based Magaldi Industries, partnered with University of Naples and National Research Council of Italy, pioneered a new form of CSP called Solar Thermoelectric Magaldi (STEM). The first plant of this type was pioneered in Sicily in 2016. This technology uses off-grid applications to produce 24-hour industrial scale power for mining sites and remote communities in Italy, other parts of Europe, Australia, Asia, North Africa and Latin America. STEM uses fluidised silica sand as a thermal storage and heat transfer medium for CSP systems. This fluidised bed benefits from a high thermal diffusivity and heat transfer coefficients, as well as high thermal capacity as a solid. The use of silica sand also lowers the cost of the CSP, and the facility aims to minimise pollution released during the production and operation of the system while producing 50-100 MWe with a storage capacity of 5–6 hours. STEM is the first CSP technology to use sand for thermal energy storage, and also allows for immediate use or storage of solar energy through a solar field made of heliostats. Such technology is especially effective in remote areas and can be easily coupled with fossil fuel plants to increase reliability of electricity supply. STEM was first applied commercially in Sicily in 2016.

Companies

References